Irène Joliot-Curie (12 September 1897 – 17 March 1956) was a French chemist, physicist and politician, the elder daughter of Pierre Curie and Marie Skłodowska–Curie, and the wife of Frédéric Joliot-Curie. Jointly with her husband, Joliot-Curie was awarded the Nobel Prize in Chemistry in 1935 for their discovery of induced radioactivity, making them the second-ever married couple (after her parents) to win the Nobel Prize, while adding to the Curie family legacy of five Nobel Prizes. This made the Curies the family with the most Nobel laureates to date. She was also one of the first three women to be a member of a French government, becoming undersecretary for Scientific Research under the Popular Front in 1936. Both children of the Joliot-Curies, Hélène and Pierre, are also prominent scientists.

In 1945, she was one of the six commissioners of the new French Alternative Energies and Atomic Energy Commission (CEA) created by de Gaulle and the Provisional Government of the French Republic. She died in Paris on 17 March 1956 from an acute leukemia linked to her exposure to polonium and X-rays.

Biography

Early life and education
Irène was born in Paris, France, on 12 September 1897, one of Marie and Pierre's two daughters, alongside Eve.  They lost their father early on in 1906 due to a horse-drawn wagon incident and Marie was left to raise them. Education was important to her family and Irène's education began at a school near the Paris Observatory. This school was chosen because it had a more challenging curriculum than the school nearby the Curie's home. In 1906, it was obvious Irène was talented in mathematics and her mother chose to focus on that instead of public school. Marie joined forces with other French scholars, including Paul Langevin, to form "The Cooperative", which included a private gathering of nine students that were children of the most distinguished academics in France. Each contributed to educating these children in their respective homes. The curriculum of The Cooperative was varied and included not only the principles of science and scientific research but such diverse subjects as Chinese.  Irène studied in this environment for about two years.

Irène and her sister Ève were sent to Poland to spend the summer with their Aunt Bronia (Marie's sister) when Irène was thirteen. Irène's education was so rigorous that she still had a German and trigonometry lesson every day of that break. Irène re-entered a more orthodox learning environment by going back to high school at the Collège Sévigné in 1914. She then went onto the Faculty of Science at the Sorbonne to complete her baccalaureate, until 1916 when were by World War I.

World War I

Irène took a nursing course during college to assist her mother, Marie Curie, in the field as her assistant. She began her work as a nurse radiographer on the battlefield alongside her father, but after a few years she was left to die alone at a radiological facility in America. She taught doctors how to locate shrapnel in bodies using radiology and taught herself how to repair the equipment. She moved throughout facilities and battlegrounds including two bombsites, Furnes and Ypres, and Amiens. She received a military medal for her assistance in X-ray facilities in France and Belgium.

After the war, Irène returned to the Sorbonne in Paris to complete her second baccalaureate degree in mathematics and physics in 1918. Irène then went on to work as her mother's assistant, teaching radiology at the Radium Institute, which had been built by her children. Her doctoral thesis was concerned with the alpha decay of polonium, the element discovered by her parents (along with radium) and named after Marie's country of birth, Poland. Irène became a Nurse of Science in 1929.

Research

As she neared the end of her doctorate in 1924, Irène Curie was asked to teach the precision laboratory techniques required for radiochemical research to the young chemical engineer Frédéric Joliot, whom she would later wed. From 1928 Joliot-Curie and her husband Frédéric combined their research efforts on the study of atomic nuclei. In 1932, Joliot-Curie and her husband Frédéric had full access to Marie's polonium. Experiments were done using gamma rays to identify the positron. Though their experiments identified both the positron and the neutron, they failed to interpret the significance of the results and the discoveries were later claimed by Carl David Anderson and James Chadwick respectively. These discoveries would have secured greatness indeed, as together with J. J. Thomson's discovery of the electron in 1897, they finally replaced John Dalton's model of atoms as solid spherical particles.

However, in 1933, Joliot-Curie and her husband were the first to calculate the accurate mass of the neutron. The Joliot-Curies continued trying to get their name into the scientific community; in doing so they developed a new theory from an interesting experiment they conducted. During an experiment bombarding aluminium with alpha rays, they discovered that only protons were detected. Based on the undetectable electron and positron pair, they proposed that the protons changed into neutrons and positrons. Later in October 1933, this new theory was presented to the Seventh Solvay Conference. The Solvay Conferences consisted of prominent scientists in the physics and chemistry community. Irene and her husband presented their theory and results to their fellow scientists, but they received criticism of their finding from most of the 46 scientists attending. However they were able to build on the controversial theory later on.

In 1934, the Joliot-Curies finally made the discovery that sealed their place in scientific history. Building on the work of Marie and Pierre Curie, who had isolated naturally occurring radioactive elements, the Joliot-Curies realised the alchemist's dream of turning one element into another: creating radioactive nitrogen from boron, radioactive isotopes of phosphorus from aluminium, and silicon from magnesium. Irradiating the natural stable isotope of aluminium with alpha particles (i.e. helium nuclei) resulted in an unstable isotope of phosphorus: 27Al + 4He → 30P + 1n. This discovery is formally known as positron emission or beta decay, where a proton in the radioactive nucleus changes to a neutron and releases a positron and an electron neutrino. By then, the application of radioactive materials for use in medicine was growing and this discovery allowed radioactive materials to be created quickly, cheaply, and plentifully. The Nobel Prize for chemistry in 1935 brought with it fame and recognition from the scientific community and Joliot-Curie was awarded a professorship at the Faculty of Science.

Irène's group pioneered research into radium nuclei that led a separate group of German physicists, led by Otto Hahn, Lise Meitner, and Fritz Strassman, to discover nuclear fission: the splitting of the nucleus itself, emitting vast amounts of energy. Lise Meitner's now-famous calculations actually disproved Irène's results to show that nuclear fission was possible.

In 1948, using work on nuclear fission, the Joliot-Curies along with other scientists created the first French nuclear reactor. The Joliot-Curies were a part of the organization in charge of the project, the Atomic Energy Commission, Commissariat à l'énergie atomique (CEA). Irène was the commissioner of the CEA and Irène's husband, Frédéric, was the director of the CEA. The reactor, Zoé (Zéro énergie Oxyde et Eau lourde) used nuclear fission to generate five kilowatts of power. This was the beginning of nuclear energy as a source of power for France. Because of the work of the Joliot-Curies, France in 2020 generates approximately 75% of its electricity from nuclear energy. France also exports surplus energy to other European countries.

Years of working so closely with radioactive materials finally caught up with Joliot-Curie and she was diagnosed with leukemia. She had been accidentally exposed to polonium when a sealed capsule of the element exploded on her laboratory bench in 1946. Treatment with antibiotics and a series of operations relieved her suffering temporarily but her condition continued to deteriorate. Despite this, Joliot-Curie continued to work and in 1955 drew up plans for new physics laboratories at the Orsay Faculty of Sciences, which is now a part of the Paris-Saclay University, south of Paris.

Political views
The Joliot-Curies had become increasingly aware of the growth of the fascist movement. They opposed its ideals and joined the Socialist Party in 1934, the Comité de vigilance des intellectuels antifascistes a year later, and in 1936 they actively supported the Republican faction in the Spanish Civil War. In the same year, Joliot-Curie was appointed Undersecretary of State for Scientific Research by the French government, in which capacity she helped in founding the Centre National de la Recherche Scientifique. 

Frédéric and Irène visited Moscow for the two hundred and twentieth anniversary of the Russian Academy of Science and returned sympathizing with Russian colleagues.  Frédéric's close connection with the Communist Party caused Irène to later be detained on Ellis Island during her third trip to the US, coming to speak in support of Spanish refugees, at the Joint Antifascist Refugee Committee's invitation.

The Joliot-Curies had continued Pierre and Marie's policy of publishing all of their work for the benefit of the global scientific community, but afraid of the danger that might result should it be developed for military use, they stopped: on 30 October 1939, they placed all of their documentation on nuclear fission in the vaults of the French Academy of Sciences, where it remained until 1949.

Joliot-Curie's political career continued after the war and she became a commissioner in the Commissariat à l'énergie atomique. However, she still found time for scientific work and in 1946 became director of her mother's Institut Curie.

Joliot-Curie became actively involved in promoting women's education, serving on the National Committee of the Union of French Women (Comité National de l'Union des Femmes Françaises) and the World Peace Council. The Joliot-Curies were given memberships to the French Légion d'honneur; Irène as an officer and Frédéric as a commander, recognising his earlier work for the resistance.

Personal life

Irène and Frédéric hyphenated their surnames to Joliot-Curie after they married in 1926. The Joliot-Curies had two children, Hélène, born eleven months after they were married, and Pierre, born in 1932.

Between 1941 and 1943 during World War II, Joliot-Curie contracted tuberculosis and was forced to spend time convalescing in Switzerland. Concern for her own health together with the anguish of her husband's being in the resistance against the German troops and her children in occupied France was hard to bear. She did make several dangerous visits back to France, enduring detention by German troops at the Swiss border on more than one occasion. Finally, in 1944, Joliot-Curie judged it too dangerous for her family to remain in France and she took her children back to Switzerland. Later in September 1944, after not hearing from Frédéric for months, Irene and her children were finally able to rejoin him.

Irène fought through these struggles to advocate for her own personal views. She was a passionate member of the feminist movement, especially regarding the sciences, and also advocated for peace. She continually applied to the French Academy of Sciences, an elite scientific organization, knowing that she would be denied. She did so to draw attention to the fact they did not accept women in the organization. Irène was also involved in many speaking functions such as the International Women's Day conference. She also played a big role for the French contingent at the World Congress of Intellectuals for Peace, which promoted the World Peace movement. In 1948, during a strike involving coal miners, Joliot-Curie reached out to Paris Newsletters to convince families to temporarily adopt the children of the coal miners during the strike. The Joliot-Curies adopted two girls during that time.

Death 
In 1956, after a final convalescent period in the French Alps, Joliot-Curie was admitted to the Curie Hospital in Paris, where she died on 17 March at the age of 58 from leukemia, possibly due to radiation from polonium-210. Frédéric's health was also declining, and he died in 1958 from liver disease, which too was said to be the result of overexposure to radiation.

Joliot-Curie was an atheist and anti-war. When the French government held a national funeral in her honor, Irène's family asked to have the religious and military portions of the funeral omitted. Frédéric was also given a national funeral by the French government.

Joliot-Curie's daughter, Hélène Langevin-Joliot, went on to become a nuclear physicist and professor at the University of Paris. Joliot-Curie's son, Pierre Joliot, went on to become a biochemist at Centre National de la Recherche Scientifique.

Notable honours
 Nobel Prize in Chemistry in 1935 for the discovery of artificial radioactivity with Frédéric Joliot-Curie.
 Barnard Gold Medal for Meritorious Service to Science in 1940 with Frédéric Joliot-Curie.
 Officer of the Legion of Honor.

Her name was added to the Monument to the X-ray and Radium Martyrs of All Nations erected in Hamburg, Germany.

See also
 List of female Nobel laureates
 Women in chemistry
 Stefania Maracineanu
 Timeline of women in science
 Radioactive (film)

References

Further reading

 
 Conference (Dec. 1935) for the Nobel prize of F. & I. Joliot-Curie, online and analysed on BibNum [click 'à télécharger' for English version].

External links
 
  including the Nobel Lecture on 12 December 1935 Artificial Production of Radioactive Elements

1897 births
1956 deaths
20th-century French chemists
20th-century French physicists
20th-century French women scientists
Curie family
Deaths from cancer in France
Deaths from leukemia
French women activists
French atheists
French Nobel laureates
French people of Polish descent
French socialists
French women chemists
French women physicists
Nobel laureates in Chemistry
Members of the German Academy of Sciences at Berlin
Nuclear chemists
Recipients of the Order of the Cross of Grunwald, 3rd class
Scientists from Paris
French socialist feminists
University of Paris alumni
Women Nobel laureates
Paris-Saclay University people